This list contains video games created for the monochrome TRS-80 computers.

Model I and III

References

External links
Big Five Software History
The Tandy Color Computer Game List

TRS-80 games